The Payne Knight Twister is a single-seat, single-engine aerobatic sport aircraft first flown by Vernon Payne Sr. in the United States in 1932 and marketed in plans form for homebuilding.

Design and development
It is a conventional biplane design with slightly staggered wings of unequal span. The wings are of fully cantilever design and do not require the bracing wires commonly used on biplanes or even interplane struts; however, most builders brace the wings with I-struts and at least one pair of wires. The cockpit is open, and the undercarriage is of fixed, tailwheel type with divided main units. The wings and horizontal stabilizer are of wooden construction, skinned in plywood, while the fuselage and vertical stabilizer are of welded steel tube covered in fabric.

Payne designed the Knight Twister in 1928 while teaching aircraft design and repair at a school attached to the  Aviation Service and Transport Company in Chicago. Construction of a prototype by Payne and his students commenced the following year but ended shortly thereafter when the school was forced to close as a consequence of the Great Depression. Payne began building a second prototype in 1931, which first flew in fall the following year powered by a Salmson 9Ad radial engine. This aircraft was damaged in a forced landing due to fuel exhaustion during a demonstration flight for the press, and parts of the airframe were reused to build the second Knight Twister in 1935. This machine, powered by a converted Ford Model A automobile engine, was built for an Argentine buyer who eventually declined to take delivery. After it had passed through several hands, Payne himself bought the aircraft back after World War II and his son, Richard, was killed in it during a test flight on which the engine failed shortly after take-off.

Operational history
The Knight Twister built a reputation as a racing aircraft. In 1964, Clyde Parsons flying the "Parsons Twister", won the Sport Biplane Championship race at Reno with a speed of 144.7 mph. In the 1970s, Don Fairbanks competed with a Knight Twister preserved initially at the Motorsports Hall of Fame of America museum in Novi, Michigan, and later in the lobby of Sporty's Pilot Shop at Clermont County Airport, Batavia, Ohio. Fairbanks set the world record in the sport biplane class of 178 mph (284 km/h) with this aircraft.

The Knight Twister has a reputation as a "handful" to fly, but this has been vigorously denied by both its designer and by Fairbanks. Both men have attributed this reputation to the controls being lighter and more responsive than those of the light aircraft that most pilots are more familiar with.

In the 1990s, the rights to the design were acquired by Steen Aero, who continue to offer plans for sale in 2009.

Variants

Data from: "Knight Twister Historical Information" (except as noted)
 KTS-1 - first prototype with Salmson 9Ad engine (1 built)
 KTD-2 - second prototype with converted Ford Model A engine designated Douglas Bear(1 built), later redesignated Knight Twister Junior 75-85
 KT-50 - version with  Continental or Franklin engine and 18-ft wingspan
 KT-75 Knight Twister Junior - version with  Continental or Lycoming engine and 17 ft 6 in-wingspan
 KT-80 - version with  Franklin engine
 KT-90 - version with  engine and 15-ft wingspan
 KTT-90 - version with  Lycoming engine and 18-ft wingspan
 KT-95 - version with  Lambert engine
 KT-125 - version with  engine  
 KT-140 - version with  engine.
 SKT-125 Sunday Knight Twister - version with  Lycoming engine and 19 ft 6 in-wingspan
 KT Holiday - version with  engine and wingspan of 19 ft 6 in
 KT Acro - version with wingspan of 15 ft 6 in
 KT Coed - version with passenger seat in tandem with pilot's; wingspan of 22 ft 6 in.
 Double Twist - A two place model with an untapered 21 ft M6 airfoil.
 Pretty Prairie Special II model 1 - Straight leg conventionally braced based on a Knight Twister, stretched 16 inches
 Pretty Prairie Special III - A Menasco powered variant displayed in the EAA Airventure Museum in Oshkosh, Wisconsin until 2006, and now at the Kansas Aviation Museum.

Specifications (KT-85)

See also

Notes

References

 
 

 
 
 
 
 
 

1930s United States sport aircraft
Homebuilt aircraft
Aerobatic aircraft
Biplanes
Single-engined tractor aircraft
Aircraft first flown in 1932